Burgdorf is an unincorporated community in the western United States, located in Idaho County, Idaho, approximately  north-northeast of McCall, at an elevation of  above sea level.

History
Originally a sacred site for Native Americans, its hot springs were discovered by unknown Chinese miners, and settled by young German immigrant Fred C. Burgdorf in the late 1860s. Burgdorf had mined in nearby Warren to the east and turned the area at the hot springs into a resort by 1870.

Following a new mining rush in 1898 at Thunder Gulch, the resort was refurbished and expanded in 1902 by Burgdorf and his new young wife, a singer from Denver named Janette Foronsard. Originally known as "Resort," it became "Burgdorf" at this time, but the former name continued in usage for several years. Following Janette's death in 1923, Burgdorf sold his interest and moved to Weiser. Burgdorf's population in 1925 was 13. 
 
Much of the community has now been deserted, although reconstruction has been attempted.  The community possessed a post office as late as 1945, although it has since been closed.

In 1972, the community was added as a historic district to the National Register of Historic Places. A new county road section through the hot springs property was constructed in the early 1980s.

Basketball coach George Karl was once part owner of Burgdorf.

See also

 National Register of Historic Places listings in Idaho County, Idaho

References

External links

  
 Discover McCall.com - Burgdorf
 Visit Idaho.org - Burgdorf Hot Springs
 Secesh.net: Burgdorf 
 Public Lands Information Center - Burgdorf, Idaho
 You Tube.com - video of Burgdorf, Idaho

Unincorporated communities in Idaho County, Idaho
Hotel buildings on the National Register of Historic Places in Idaho
Unincorporated communities in Idaho
National Register of Historic Places in Idaho County, Idaho
German-American culture in Idaho